Agi is a Torricelli language of Papua New Guinea.

References

External links 
OLAC resources in and about the Agi language

Palei languages
Languages of Sandaun Province